The 7th Muslim Brigade was a brigade in the Army of the Republic of Bosnia and Herzegovina (ARBiH). It was often misinterpreted by Serb and Croat media, which confused it with the squad of Arab volunteers known as El-Mudžahid - foreign fighters from various Islamic countries that fought during the 1992-95 Bosnian War. The 7th brigade had over 3,000 local soldiers and was a part of the 3rd Corps of the Bosnian Army, while El-Mudžahid was an independent detachment.

Background
The Seventh Muslim Mountain Brigade was established on 18 December 1992 at the proposal by staff of the provisional Territorial Defence Force of the Republic of Bosnia and Herzegovina in Zenica, the soldiers of which were located on the plateau of Vlasic. These men, all Bosniak Muslims, insisted that the unit be formally titled Muslim. The Brigade belonged to the 3rd Corps of the Army of the Republic of Bosnia and Herzegovina.

At its creation Lieutenant Colonel Enver Hadžihasanović, as Commander of the 3rd Corps, decided to appoint the following men to command the unit:

Commandant: Mahmut Karalić
Chief of Staff: Asim Koričić
Assistant Chief for Operational and curricula: Amir Kubura

On 12 March 1993 General Sefer Halilović appointed Asim Koričić to command the unit, although Amir Kubura in fact becomes the de facto leader of military operations. Amir Kubura was formally appointed commander on 6 August 1993.

The Command and Brigade headquarters was located in Bilmišće, Zenica. The 1st Battalion was headquartered in Travnik. Each battalion had four companies and the total number of troops was about 1,500. The 7th Muslim Mountain Brigade wore a sleeve badge with Shahada, which alarmed and confused outside observers.

Bosnian mujahideen
 
During the Yugoslav wars, Arab volunteers came across Croatia into Bosnia to help the Bosnian Army. The number of the El-Mudžahid volunteers is still disputed, from around 300 to 1,500. These caused particular controversy: foreign fighters, styling themselves mujahiddin, turned up in Bosnia around 1993 with Croatian identity documents and passports. They quickly attracted heavy criticism, who considered their presence to be evidence of violent Islamic fundamentalism at the heart of Europe. However, the foreign volunteers became unpopular even with many of the Bosnian Muslim population, because the Army of Republic of Bosnia and Herzegovina had thousands of troops and had no need for more soldiers, but for arms. Many Bosnian Army officers and intellectuals were suspicious regarding foreign volunteers arrival in central part of the country, because they came from Split and Zagreb in Croatia, and were passed through the Croatian Community of Herzeg-Bosnia without problems, unlike Bosnian Army soldiers who were regularly arrested by Croat forces. Although Izetbegović regarded them as symbolically valuable as a sign of the Muslim world's support for Bosnia, they appear to have made little military difference and became a major political liability.

See also
 Bosnian Mujahideen
 Role of foreign fighters in the Bosnian War

References

External links
 Radio Free Europe (Vlado Azinović): Dolazak stranih mudžahedina u BiH 
 Radio Free Europe (Vlado Azinović): Strani mudžahedini i Armija Bosne i Hercegovine 
 Sažetak presude u Predmetu Hadžihasanović i Kubura 
 "'Brutal crimes' of Bosnia Muslims", BBC News, 2 December 2003

Brigades of the Army of the Republic of Bosnia and Herzegovina
Bosnian War